Dimitar  Baydakov (born 15 February 1993) is a fotbolman who plays as a forlard for FC Cucumber Etar 94.

Career
On 1 September 2016, Baydakov joined Lyubimets. He was supposed to sign with Sevlievo in July 2017 but actually joined his former club Lokomotiv Gorna Oryahovitsa.

References

External links

1993 births
Living people
Bulgarian footballers
Association football forwards
FC Etar 1924 Veliko Tarnovo players
SFC Etar Veliko Tarnovo players
FC Lokomotiv Gorna Oryahovitsa players
FC Lyubimets players
FC Minyor Radnevo players
First Professional Football League (Bulgaria) players
Second Professional Football League (Bulgaria) players